Rick Huskey is an American minister. He was a co-founder of the United Methodist Gay Clergy Caucus, alongside Gene Leggett, which later became known as Affirmation.

Activism 
In 1971, Huskey and other college students started the Northfield Gay Liberation Front, which was one of the first publicly run LGBT groups for college students. Huskey met Gene Leggett at the 1972 General Conference in Atlanta for Methodist clergy. The two attempted to engage other delegates in conversations about homosexuality and the church though few delegates responded positively. The conference attendees issued the Hand Amendment, which was unfavorable to homosexual clergy.

The following spring Huskey and Leggett traveled across the East Coast and started a network of gay and lesbian United Methodist clergy. At the 1976 United Methodist General Conference, Huskey served on the theological task force of the Gay United Methodists network.

Ministry 
In 1974, after receiving his Doctor of Ministry degree from Chicago Theological Seminary, Huskey returned to Minnesota where he was an associate pastor at Good Samaritan United Methodist Church in Edina. In a discussion about pastoral appointments, Huskey told his bishop that he was gay and that he wanted to start a ministry for gay and lesbians in Minnesota. The bishop placed Huskey on "voluntary location" which removed him from his parish position.

When Huskey was removed, over 100 gay men and lesbians were involved in a protest during the Minnesota Annual Conference ordination service to protest Huskey's removal. The protest was organized by Gene Leggett who had also lead similar protests in Southwest Texas Annual Conference sessions.

See also 
 Karen Oliveto 
 Paul Abels 
 Homosexuality and Methodism

References 

1950 births
People from Minneapolis
St. Olaf College alumni
Chicago Theological Seminary alumni
American Methodist clergy
American LGBT rights activists
Living people
LGBT people from Minnesota